South Fork Wind Farm is a utility-scale offshore wind farm currently being constructed on the Outer Continental Shelf Offshore Rhode Island (RI) which will provide energy to New York state.

South Fork is a major (130 MW, 12-turbine) commercial offshore wind power project. It will be located 16.6 nautical miles southeast of Rhode Island's Block Island and 26 nautical miles east of Montauk Point on the South Fork of New York's Long Island. The wind farm is projected to provide electricity to proved 70,000 Long Island homes. The specific location of the project is a  section of Wind Energy Area (WEA) OCS-A 0486 (North Lease).  The wind farm is to connect to the power grid through an underwater cable to East Hampton, New York.

New York Governor Kathy Hochul and Interior Secretary Deb Haaland held a groundbreaking ceremony in February 2022 for the project, being built by Ørsted US Offshore Wind in conjunction with Eversource and the Long Island Power Authority.

History

Deepwater Wind
On September 12, 2013, BOEM awarded two commercial offshore wind energy leases, OCS-A-0486 and OCS-A-0487, to Deepwater Wind New England LLC for development of a regional offshore wind energy project. Deepwater ONE (formerly Deepwater Wind Energy Center) would be located in the Atlantic Ocean on 256 square miles on the outer continental shelf, approximately 30 miles east of Montauk, New York, and 15 miles east of Martha's Vineyard, Massachusetts. The project would consist of 150 to 200 turbines with a total nameplate generating capacity of 900 to 1,200 MW. It includes a 98-mile, 600 MW submarine transmission line, a new regional HVDC transmission system, and a New York-Long Island interconnector to link the electrical supply system in New England and Long Island.

Deepwater Wind, the predecessor to Orsted, originally proposed a 90-megawatt, 15-turbine wind farm in area where it had leased 256 square miles the area in 2013. (The leased area has a potential of supporting 200 turbines.) Long Island Power Authority recommended the project for approval in July 2016, which was delayed in July 2016 at the request of the New York State Energy Research and Development Authority (NYSERDA). Regulatory approval for a 90 MW wind farm was granted in January 2017.  Thomas Falcone, CEO of LIPA, said they hope to complete the contract in first quarter 2017 with construction beginning in 2019 and that it would be online in 2022.  The target of the power to be generated is to power structures in Southampton and East Hampton on the South Fork of Long Island, the latter of has  vowed to have 100 percent of its energy coming from renewable sources. The project was later expanded to 132 megawatt capacity in 2018.

Ørsted

Ørsted US Offshore Wind acquired Deepwater Wind in 2019. It is partnering with Eversource Energy to construct the wind farm. The project will use twelve Siemens Gamesa 11 megawatt turbines. Long Island Power Authority will purchase the electricity generated. NYSERDA has approved the project. Pending further approvals it is expected to come on line in 2022.

In 2020, the Citizens for the Preservation of Wainscott, a group of property owners in the hamlet of Wainscott, New York started a petition to incorporate 4.4 square miles of the community as a village.  A driving force of the petition was to fight a proposal for the preferred location for the 138-kilovolt electricity transmission line (export cable) to come ashore in the community at Beach Lane en route to an electrical substation in East Hampton. The effort divided members of the community, with other residents organizing in support of the project. The town board and town trustees have approved the project, granting an easement allowing for the export cable in Wainscott. The petition to separately incorporate was rejected as "legally insufficient" in March 2021.

In January 2021, New York Governor Andrew Cuomo announced that the South Brooklyn Marine Terminal would be developed to include a wind turbine assembly plant to be partially funded by New York State. Turbines assembled there will be used in three offshore wind farms off the east end of Long Island. South Fork Wind Farm, Beacon Wind and Sunrise Wind are projected to be supplied by 2025 from the new plant, built with $200 million in state funding and $200 million in matching grants. Part of a $29 billion 'Green Initiative' plan for New York, the project is expected to create 1,200 new manufacturing jobs in Brooklyn.

Regulatory approvals
In November 2021, Interior Department approved the project. It still need permits from the Environmental Protection Agency, U.S. Army Corps of Engineers, and other state and federal agencies.

See also
Block Island Wind Farm
Cape Wind
List of offshore wind farms
List of offshore wind farms in the United States
Wind power in Massachusetts
Wind power in New York
Wind power in Rhode Island
Wind power in the United States

References 

New York (state) infrastructure
Offshore wind farms in the United States
Proposed wind farms in the United States
Wind power in Connecticut
Wind power in New York (state)
Wind power in Rhode Island